Øyafestivalen is an annual Norwegian music festival held in the Tøyen Park, Oslo. It has grown quickly since its modest start in 1999 and has become one of Norway's biggest and most important music festivals .

The festival has previously featured musicians like Sonic Youth, Iggy and The Stooges, Arctic Monkeys, Babyshambles, Morrissey and Beck.

The festival lasts for four days in the main park area, and is preceded by a club night where the festival holds concerts in more or less all of Oslo's central clubs.

History 
For the first two years, the festival was held on Kalvøya, near Sandvika just outside Oslo. Contrary to popular belief, it is not the same festival as the old Kalvøyafestivalen, which was also held at Kalvøya.

After its first two years at Kalvøya, the festival was in 2001 moved to Middelalderparken in downtown Oslo, making it more of a central festival . More than 80 bands played in the park in 2009.

Then, in 2014, as construction works made it impossible to hold the festival in Middelalderparken, it was moved to the Tøyen Park. The festival was not arranged for the years 2020 and 2021 due to restrictions and the global pandemic.

History/Bookings

References

External links

 

Music festivals in Oslo
Summer events in Norway